Lumière Peak is a peak,  high, standing  southeast of Cape Tuxen on the west coast of Graham Land, Antarctica. It was discovered by the Third French Antarctic Expedition, 1903–05, and named by Jean-Baptiste Charcot for Louis Lumière, a leader in photographic research and development in France at that time.

References

Mountains of Graham Land
Danco Coast